The Forsyth County Public Library (FCPL) is a consortium of four public libraries in Forsyth County, Georgia, United States. All four branches are located in the county seat of Cumming.

The Forsyth County Public Library as of 2015 had the highest circulation per capita in the state of Georgia. The Sharon Forks branch was recognized as the busiest library in the state, with a circulation of over one million materials.

History

Early years: Gwinnett–Forsyth Regional Library
The first library in Forsyth County was run out of the home of Laura Hockenhull, who at the time owned a private library and decided to open it up to the public. By 1938 the Works Progress Administration (WPA) of Forsyth opened the first formal county library with a collection of just over 600 volumes. With funding from the WPA, this collection of books was housed throughout the county, largely on a bookmobile that covered 20 routes through the county.

In 1956, in an effort to consolidate resources, Forsyth and Gwinnett County created a joint library system named the Gwinnett–Forsyth Regional Library System. Their partnership drastically increased the number of volumes available in the system as Gwinnett County housed a half-dozen library locations while the Forsyth library collections were spread out among various buildings.

Finally, in 1966 a formal location for library use was constructed in Forsyth County. Funding came from the federal Library Services and Construction Act, allowing for a centralized location for most of the county's books. By this time, due to the county's proximity to Atlanta, the population in Forsyth and nearby counties was booming. A bond referendum, passed in 1988, allocated $2.1 million for the improvement of the county libraries, and the state of Georgia matched this with a $2 million grant for construction of a new building which opened in 1992.

In 1995, Gwinnett County decided to dissolve the Gwinnett–Forsyth Regional Library System as their population and accommodations had grown to a point of independence.

Forsyth County Public Library
The following year, 1996, as a response to the split from Gwinnett county, Forsyth county passed a special-purpose local-option sales tax (SPLOST) in order to raise funds to build a new library branch. This was repeated in 1998 to open the Sharon Forks Branch in 2000.

In 2010 a third location, the Hampton Park Library was opened. In 2013 the Post Road Library had opened, marking FCPL's fourth location.

Forsyth County is in the process of allocating funds to construct two new libraries in southwest and northwest Forsyth. It is also using SPLOST funds to rebuild the Sharon Forks Library.

Branches

Library systems in neighboring counties
Chestatee Regional Library System to the north
Sequoyah Regional Library System to the west
Atlanta-Fulton Public Library System to the southwest
Gwinnett County Public Library to the south
Hall County Library System to the east

References

External links
FCPL catalog

County library systems in Georgia (U.S. state)
Public libraries in Georgia (U.S. state)